Dhia' ul-Dīn 'Abd al-Malik ibn Yūsuf al-Juwaynī al-Shafi'ī (17 February 102820 August 1085; 419–478 AH) was a Persian Sunni scholar famous for being the foremost leading jurisconsult, legal theorist and Islamic theologian of his time. His name is commonly abbreviated as al-Juwayni; he is also commonly referred to as Imam al Haramayn meaning "leading master of the two holy cities", that is, Mecca and Medina. He acquired the status of a mujtahid in the field of fiqh and usul al-fiqh. Highly celebrated as one of the most important and influential thinkers in the Shafi'i  school of orthodox Sunni jurisprudence, he was considered as the virtual second founder of the Shafi'i school, after its first founder Imam al-Shafi'i. He was also considered a major figurehead within the Ash'ari school of theology where he was ranked equal to the founder, Imam al-Ash'ari. He  was given the honorific titles of Shaykh of Islam, The Glory of Islam, The Absolute Imam of all Imams.

Biography

Born
Al-Juwayni was born on 17 February 1028  in a village on the outskirts of Naysabur called Bushtaniqan in Iran, Al-Juwayni was a prominent Muslim scholar known for his gifted intellect in Islamic legal matters. Al-Juwayni was born into a family of legal study. His father, Abu Muhammad al-Juwayni, was a well-known master of Law in the Shafi′i community as well as a Shafi'i teacher and his older brother, Abu'l-Hasan 'Ali al-Juwayni, was a Sufi teacher of Hadith.

Education
Al-Juwayni grew up in Naysabur, an intellectually thriving area drawing scholars to it. Naturally, Juwayni did not have to search far for his education. At the time, the teachings of the Shafi'i school were closely linked to the Ash'arite theology which al-Juwayni decided to study for several years after the death of his father, he took over for his father at this point and began his teaching career at only 19 years of age due to his intelligence, eloquence, learning and charisma.

Fleeing and coming back
Al-Juwayni was left to flee Nishapur by force when the Karramite governor Al-Kundduri passed a verdict to curse Abu Hassan al-Ashari during the weekly Friday prayer gatherings and to imprison any of his adherents. Among those that were forced to secretly flee were Abu Sahl al-Bastami, Al-Furati, Al-Qushayri and Al-Bayhaqi and many other scholars of the Shafi'is.  

As a result Al-Juwayni fled to Mecca and Medina in search of an new home. He taught knowledge and wrote books in Hijaz for four years. His scholarship was so widely acclaimed amongst the scholars of the Hejaz that he acquired the title of Imam al Haramayn meaning "leading master of the two holy cities". He gained a large following and was invited back to Nishapur as an undisputed grand mufti once Nizam Al Mulk took power, and was appointed the headmaster of newly-built prestigious Nizamiyya school where he stayed for the next 30 years, training and preparing for the next generation of Shafi'i jurists and Ash'ari theologians. Al-Juwayni spent his life studying and producing influential treatises in Muslim government; it is suspected that most of his works (below) came out of this period after his return from Mecca and Medina.

Foremost pupil

Al-Juwayni was the teacher of one of the most influential scholars in the Islamic tradition, al-Ghazali. Following are some of the famous remarks of al-Juwayni towards al-Ghazali:

Death
He died of jaundice and was buried at his home after a huge crowd attended his funeral. Unrestrained demonstration of sorrow by four hundred of his over-zealous students lasted for days in Khurasan. Ibn 'Asakir said: "I believe that the marks of his hard work and striving in Allah's Religion shall endure until the rising of the Hour."

Doctrine
Al-Juwayni, a Sunni jurist and Mutakallim, or scholar engaged in the study of theological principles, spent his life deciphering between what a Muslim ought and ought not to do. He was said to be stubborn and unaccepting of any legal speculation whatsoever. His basic principle was that the law should not be left to speculation on any grounds. Rather, texts hold the answers to any possible legal debate in some capacity or another. He was a master of the Quran and Hadith texts in addition to being well versed in the particular school of Shafi'i and theological practices of the Ash'arite persuasion.

Reception
Ibn Asakir said: "the Glory of Islam, absolute Imam of all imams, main authority in the Law, whose leadership is agreed upon East and West, whose immense merit is the consensus of Arabs and non-Arabs, upon the like of whom none set eyes before or after." Al-Kawthari said: "whose work forms the connecting link between the respective methods of the Salaf and Khalaf."  

Al-Bakhirzi made a comparison of Al-Juwanyi's to Al-Shafi'i and Al-Muzani in jurisprudence, Al-Asmaʿi in manners, Al-Hasan al-Basri in preaching eloquence, and Al-Ash'ari in speculative theology. Ibn 'Asakir replied and said: "Truly he is above that by far." Ibn al-Subki said: "Whoever thinks that there is anyone in the Four Schools that comes near his clarity of speech has no knowledge of him."

Works
His well-known works:

kalam
 Al-Irshad, is a major classic of Islamic theology.
 Al-Shamil
 Al-'Aqida al-Nizamiyya

fiqh
 Nihayat al-Matlab fi Dirayat al-Madhhab  ("The End of the Quest in the Knowledge of the [Shafi'i] School"), his magnum opus, which Ibn 'Asakir said had no precedent in Islam.
 Ghiyath al-Umam
 Mughith al-Khalq
 Mukhtasar al-Nihaya
usul al-fiqh
 Al-Burhan, considered as one of the four main books in this science. 
 Al-Talkhis
 Al-Waraqat

The book Fara'id al-Simtayn is sometimes mistakenly thought to be authored by the Sunni Abd'al Malik al-Juwayni. It was in fact authored by another Sunni scholar, Ibrahim bin Muhammad bin Himaway al Juwaynim who died in 1322 (722 A.H.)

 See also
 List of Ash'aris and Maturidis
 List of Muslim theologians

References
 Musharraf, M. N. (2015) "Explanation of Al-Waraqat - A Classical Text on Usul Al Fiqh", Printed by Australian Islamic Library, WA. 
 Al-Juwayni,Yusef. A Guide to the Conclusive Proofs for the Principles of Belief. 1 ed. Eissa S. Muhammad. The Center for Muslim Contribution to Civilization, 2000.
 Messick, Brinkley. "Kissing Hands and Knees: Hegemony and Hierarchy in Shari'a Discourse." Law & Society Review 22, no. 4 (1988): 637–660.
 Hallaq, Wael B.. "Caliphs, Jurists and the Saljuqs in the Political Thought of Juwayni." The Muslim World 74, no. 1 (1984): 26–41.
 Fadiman & Frager,James & Robert. Essential Sufism. 1 ed. James Fadiman & Robert Frager. San Francisco : HarperCollins, 1997.
 Johnston, David. "A Turn in the Epistemology and Hermeneutics of Twentieth Century Usul Al-Fiqh." Islamic Law & Society 11, no. 2 (2004): 233–282.
 Sohaira Z.M Siddiqui, Law and Politics under the Abbasids. An Intellectual Portrait of al-Juwayni'', Cambridge University Press, avril 2019.

Citations

External links 

 Imam al-Haramayn al-Juwayni
 The Waraqat of Imam al-Haramayn al-Juwayni 
 Exegesis of quranic verses mentioning God's Attributes  Archive
 Author analysis Faraa’d al Simtayn  

Asharis
Shafi'is
Shaykh al-Islāms
Mujaddid
11th-century Muslim theologians
Sunni fiqh scholars
Persian Sunni Muslim scholars of Islam
Muhaddiths from Nishapur
11th-century Iranian people
1028 births
1085 deaths
Juvayni family
11th-century jurists